Yangmak station is a small freight-only railway station in Chaeyang-dong, Ryonggang county, South P'yŏngan province, North Korea. It is the terminus of the Husan Line of the Korean State Railway. The tracks continue beyond the station to serve a large granite quarry.

References

Railway stations in North Korea